HMS Mary Rose, launched on 8 October 1915, was an  sunk on 17 October 1917 approximately 70 miles east of Lerwick in an action off Lerwick while escorting a convoy of 12 merchant ships from Norway. The wreck is designated as a protected place under the Protection of Military Remains Act 1986.

Loss
The convoy had sailed from Norway on 16 October; at dawn on the following day, the captain of the Mary Rose, Lieutenant-Commander Fox, observed two warships approaching. Their profiles and dark-grey colour led him to assume they were British light cruisers, and recognition signals were duly transmitted.

The German ships closed to  before opening fire, quickly sinking the convoy's second escort, . Mary Rose was hit in the engine room shortly afterwards, and disabled. Sub-Lieutenenant Marsh, RNVR, maintained fire with the one gun left operational, while the only two surviving members of the torpedo crew, French and Bailey, were able to fire the last remaining torpedo, but to no avail. With further salvoes wrecking the superstructure, Fox ordered Master Gunner Handcock to scuttle the ship. The ship's boats reduced to matchwood, only a handful of men survived by clinging to a raft; Fox and the First Lieutenant went down with the ship. Several hours later, the survivors boarded a lifeboat from one of the merchant ships and were able to reach Norway.

The escorts sunk, Brummer and Bremse proceeded to sink nine of the merchant ships; only three and two trawlers survived. One of the crew Able seamen, A Holden died in Norway and is buried In Roan Cemetery

Epilogue
In response to the new threat of surface raiders, later convoys were accorded heavier escorts, which ensured there was no repetition of the disaster.

References

Bibliography

External links
 http://www.battleships-cruisers.co.uk/destroyers_before_1900.htm
 SI 2008/0950 Designation under the Protection of Military Remains Act 1986

External links 

 Battle of Jutland Crew Lists Project - HMS Mary Rose Crew List

 

Admiralty M-class destroyers
Ships built on the River Tyne
1915 ships
World War I destroyers of the United Kingdom
Protected Wrecks of the United Kingdom
Ships built by Swan Hunter
Maritime incidents in 1917
World War I shipwrecks in the North Sea